The Harbor Defenses of Argentia and St. John's was a United States Army Coast Artillery Corps harbor defense command in World War II. It was part of the Newfoundland Base Command, established as a result of the 1940 Destroyers for Bases Agreement with the United Kingdom. It coordinated the US Army coast defenses of Naval Station Argentia and the port of St. John's, Newfoundland from January 1941 to (possibly) August 1945. These included coast artillery at Fort McAndrew in Argentia and Fort Pepperrell in St. John's.

History
On 15 January 1941 the Newfoundland Base Command was activated on board the United States Army troop transport ship USAT Edmund B. Alexander at the New York Port of Embarkation. The ship departed for Argentia and St. John's on the 20th, arriving at Argentia on the 25th to drop off troops and construction personnel, and soon docking in St. John's as a barracks ship until May 1941, when housing for the garrison was finished. The ship brought troops of the 3rd Battalion, 3rd Infantry Regiment, Battery A of the 57th Coast Artillery (Tractor Drawn) (TD) Regiment with four mobile 155 mm guns, and Battery B of the 62nd Coast Artillery (Anti-aircraft) (AA) Regiment. It appears the 155 mm gun battery may have been split with two guns each at Argentia and St. John's; their presence at St. John's prior to 1942 is uncertain. It is likely the other units were split also. Although the harbor defense command was reportedly activated with the arrival of the 155 mm gun battery, it was on a small scale initially. On 27 March 1941 the United States officially signed the Lend-Lease agreement which gave possession of the site for Fort Pepperrell (initially Camp Alexander) near St. John's; construction work began in earnest on 15 April. The Naval Operating Base at Naval Station Argentia was commissioned on 15 July 1941; the adjacent Naval Air Station (NAS) Argentia was commissioned 28 August 1941. 

On 20 July 1941 the 155 mm gun battery was redesignated as Battery A, 53rd Coast Artillery (TD) Regiment, and on 1 August 1941 (some sources 1942) the AA battery was redesignated as Battery A, 421st CA (AA) Battalion (Separate). At some time the remainder of the 421st probably arrived in Newfoundland. On 14 April 1942 a second AA battalion, the 422nd CA (AA) (Composite) arrived in Newfoundland. On 11 November 1943 the CA (AA) battalions were redesignated as Antiaircraft Artillery (AAA) Battalions (Composite). Both battalions returned to the United States in January 1944.

During 1941 two Lend-Lease 10-inch M1888 disappearing guns were emplaced at Fort Cape Spear near St. John's; these were manned by Canadian forces. Another pair of 10-inch guns were at Botwood in northern Newfoundland. These were supplemented by at least two Canadian-manned QF 4.7-inch B Mark IV* guns at Fort Amherst; these were former field guns converted to fixed mountings. On 1 May 1941 part of Battery D, 52nd Coast Artillery (Railway) Regiment arrived at Fort Pepperrell with two 8-inch M1888 railway guns, initially emplaced at Signal Hill. At some point in 1942-43 they moved to Red Cliff. 

In the summer of 1941,  deployed to Argentia to house flag headquarters for the base.

On 7 December 1941 the United States entered World War II following the attack on Pearl Harbor. Construction ramped up at US facilities in Newfoundland; for coast defense batteries this was primarily at Argentia. The major effort at this time was the construction of Battery 281 and Battery 282 at Fort McAndrew from January through October 1942. These batteries had two 6-inch guns each, on shielded long-range carriages with reinforced concrete and earth bunkers housing magazines and fire control equipment.

Two indicator loop stations for magnetic detection of submarines were established in Newfoundland; a US Navy-manned station at Argentia (Station 1X) and a Royal Canadian Navy-manned station at St. John's.

On 14 February 1942 the 1st Battalion, 3rd Infantry Regiment was activated in Newfoundland, joining the 3rd Battalion; the remainder of the regiment arrived on 6 July 1942. The 2nd Battalion moved to Greenland at some point soon afterward, and the regiment departed Newfoundland in September 1943. On 16 February 1942 the 8-inch and 155 mm batteries were redesignated as elements of the 24th Coast Artillery Regiment, which became the primary coast artillery unit in Newfoundland through October 1944 at least, and possibly to the end of hostilities. The regimental headquarters and two additional batteries arrived at Fort McAndrew on 25 March 1942.

Truxtun lost 110 men (nearly her entire crew) and Pollux lost 95 men.  also grounded, but with no loss of life. Over 100 victims were buried in Argentia's military cemetery.

By the end of 1942 the US-manned coast defense gun batteries in Newfoundland were as follows (at Argentia unless otherwise noted):

The Anti-Motor Torpedo Boat (AMTB) batteries had four 90 mm dual-purpose guns each, two on fixed mounts and two on towed mounts. 

The 24th Coast Artillery was reduced to a battalion on 23 March 1943. The unit was partially inactivated in January 1944 (HHB and one battery inactivated; one source says fully inactivated), and in October 1944 the battalion was reorganized with at least one battery inactivated. If fully inactivated, possibly its functions and personnel were transferred to the harbor defense command. Its date of return to the US is unclear, and unusually it was not fully inactivated until 8 September 1945.

Post World War II
Following the war, it was soon determined that gun defenses were obsolete, and most guns (unusually, not the Canadian-manned guns mentioned or Batteries 281 and 282) were scrapped by the end of 1948. Argentia remained a US Navy station until 1995, and Fort Pepperrell became Pepperrell Air Force Base postwar, but was transferred to Canada as CFS St. John's in 1960.

Campaign streamers
World War II
 American Theater without inscription

Present
The pair of Canadian-manned 10-inch guns at Fort Cape Spear remain in place without carriages, and the pair of 4.7-inch guns at Fort Amherst are still mounted as of 2014. Unusually, the four guns of Batteries 281 and 282 were never scrapped. Battery 282's pair of 6-inch guns remain in place, while Battery 281's guns and mountings were shipped to Fort Columbia in Washington state, US for display at a similar battery there in 1993.

See also
 Seacoast defense in the United States
 Harbor Defense Command

References

 

 Gaines, William C., Coast Artillery Organizational History, 1917-1950, Coast Defense Journal, vol. 23, issue 2, p. 16

External links
 Map of Harbor Defenses of Argentia at FortWiki.com
 Map of Harbor Defenses of St. John's at FortWiki.com
 List of all US coastal forts and batteries at the Coast Defense Study Group, Inc. website
 American Forts Network, lists forts in the US, former US territories, Canada, and Central America
 FortWiki, lists most CONUS and Canadian forts

United States Army Coast Artillery Corps
Military installations in Newfoundland and Labrador
Military units and formations established in 1941
Military units and formations disestablished in 1945